The men's 4 × 10 kilometre relay cross-country skiing competition at the 1998 Winter Olympics in Nagano, Japan, was held on 18 February at Snow Harp.

Race summary
The opening leg in Nagano was a surprise with Germany leading, and Norway in 10th place, as Sture Sivertsen hit the wall at eight kilometers. After the 1st exchange Finland was third and Italy fourth, but the margin was less than 20 seconds to Finland. On the second leg Erling Jevne pulled Norway up to second, still trailing Italy and Fulvio Valbusa by 12 seconds. Norway sent out Bjørn Dæhlie on the third leg, and he made up ground on Fabio Maj. At the final exchange, Italy led by 0.5 seconds, with Finland in third, though a full minute behind.

As in Lillehammer the anchor leg battle between Norway and Italy was tight. Thomas Alsgaard was the Norwegian anchor, facing Italy's Silvio Fauner. As the Italians had done four years before, Alsgaard sat on Fauner's tail for most of the leg, refusing to take the lead. Then in the stadium he unleashed a sprint 150 metres from the line, to win the gold medal for his team by 2/10ths of a second. For Bjørn Dæhlie this was his seventh gold medal, a Winter Olympic record at the time.

Finland hung on for the bronze medal, but they were closely challenged by Sweden, which was less than 10 seconds away from the podium.

Results
Each team used four skiers, with each completing racing over the same 10 kilometre circuit. The first two raced in the classical style, and the final pair of skiers raced freestyle.

References

Men's cross-country skiing at the 1998 Winter Olympics
Men's 4 × 10 kilometre relay cross-country skiing at the Winter Olympics